The Great Sandy Desert is an interim Australian bioregion, located in the northeast of Western Australia straddling the Pilbara and southern Kimberley regions and extending east into the Northern Territory. The Gibson Desert lies to the south and the Tanami Desert lies to the east of the Great Sandy Desert.

Features
The Great Sandy Desert contains large ergs, often consisting of longitudinal dunes.
In the north east of the desert there is a meteorite impact crater, the Wolfe Creek crater.

Population
The region is sparsely populated. The main populations consist of Aboriginal Australian communities and mining centres. The Aboriginal people of the desert fall into two main groups, the Martu in the west and the Pintupi in the east. Linguistically, they are speakers of multiple Western Desert languages. Many of these indigenous people were forcibly removed from their lands during the late 18th, 19th, and the early 20th centuries, to be relocated to other settlements, such as Papunya in the Northern Territory. In the late 20th and early 21st centuries, some of the original inhabitants returned. Young adults, from the Great Sandy Desert region, travel to and work in the Wilurarra Creative programs to maintain and develop their culture, and a greater sense of community.

Climate
Rainfall is low throughout the coast and, especially further north, is strongly seasonal. Areas near the Kimberley have an average rainfall that exceeds , but can be patchy. Many dry years end with a monsoon cloud mass or a tropical cyclone. Like many of Australia's deserts, precipitation is high by desert standards, but with the driest regions recording total rainfall a little below . The heat of Australia’s ground surface, in turn, creates a massive evaporation cycle, which partially explains the higher-than-normal desert rainfall. This region is one which gives rise to the heat lows, which help drive the NW monsoon. Almost all the rain regionally comes from monsoon thunderstorms, or the occasional tropical cyclone rain depression.

Annually, for most of the area, there are about 20–30 days where thunderstorms form. However, in the north and bordering the Kimberley, 30-40 per year is the average.

Summer daytime temperatures are some of the highest in Australia. Regions further south average , except when monsoonal cloud cover is active. Several people have died in this region during seasonal flooding, after their vehicles were stuck or broken down on remote dirt roads. Conversely, a few travellers have had their vehicles malfunction during the hottest times of the year, with dehydration, sun exposure and heatstroke being the predominant causes of death.

Frost does not occur in most of the area. The regions bordering the Gibson Desert in the far southeast may record a light frost or two every year. Away from the coast winter nights can still be chilly in comparison to the warm days.

Economy
Indigenous art is a huge industry in central Australia. Mines, most importantly the Telfer gold mine and Nifty copper mine, and cattle stations are found in the far west. Telfer is one of the largest gold mines in Australia. The undeveloped Kintyre uranium deposit lies south of Telfer.

Fauna and flora
The vegetation of the Great Sandy Desert is dominated by spinifex.

Animals in the region include feral camels, dingoes, goannas (including the large perentie) and numerous species of lizards and birds. Other animal inhabitants include bilbies, mulgara, marsupial moles, rufous hare-wallabies, thorny devils, bearded dragons, and red kangaroos.

Some of the bird-life found within the desert include the rare Alexandra's parrot, the mulga parrot and the scarlet-chested parrot.

See also

 Carnegie expedition of 1896
 Deserts of Australia
 Gary Junction Road
 List of deserts by area
 Telfer, Western Australia

References

Further reading

External links

 
Biogeography of the Northern Territory
Biogeography of Western Australia
Deserts of the Northern Territory
Deserts of Western Australia
Ergs
Pilbara
Canning Stock Route
Kimberley (Western Australia)